Green Milk from the Planet Orange are a band from Tokyo formed in 2001 after the breakup of the band No rest for the dead. Their music combines elements of psychedelic rock, prog-rock and punk.

The band had several line-up changes, but was always centered on members A (drums, synth), dead k (guitar) and various bassists (T, Benjian and Margarette H).

In May 2007 their clip "Demagog" was number one of Google Videos "Top 100 Videos - United States" ranking.

The band got considerable attention for an experimental band with a small, but devoted cult following outside Japan, until it announced its breakup in October 2008, due to artistic differences between members A and dead K.

The band regrouped on February 28, 2012, with A, T, and dead k playing a single show at Kichijoji GOK Sound Studio.

According to the City Calls Revolution liner notes, the following instruments are used by the band:
Korg MS-2000
Fender Jazz Bass
Gibson SG

Discography 
 The Shape of Rock to Come, 2001, Ancient
 Birth of the Neo Trip, 2002, Ancient
 He's Crying "Look", 2004, Beta-Lactam Ring
 City Calls Revolution, 2005, Beta-Lactam Ring
 Pirate Radio (digital only), 2006, Beta-Lactam Ring
 You Take me to the World, 2007, Beta-Lactam Ring
Third, 2019, Inferior Planet

External links 
MySpace

References

Japanese rock music groups
Musical groups from Tokyo